Spirobolus taprobanensis, is a species of round-backed millipede in the family Spirobolidae. It is endemic to Sri Lanka.

References

Spirobolida
Endemic fauna of Sri Lanka
Millipedes of Asia
Animals described in 1865